A chain is a serial assembly of connected pieces, called links, typically made of metal, with an overall character similar to that of a rope in that it is flexible and curved in compression but linear, rigid, and load-bearing in tension. A chain may consist of two or more links. Chains can be classified by their design, which can be dictated by their use: 
 Those designed for lifting, such as when used with a hoist; for pulling; or for securing, such as with a bicycle lock, have links that are torus shaped, which make the chain flexible in two dimensions (the fixed third dimension being a chain's length). Small chains serving as jewellery are a mostly decorative analogue of such types.
 Those designed for transferring power in machines have links designed to mesh with the teeth of the sprockets of the machine, and are flexible in only one dimension. They are known as roller chains, though there are also non-roller chains such as block chains.

Two distinct chains can be connected using a quick link, carabiner, shackle, or clevis.
Load can be transferred from a chain to another object by a chain stopper.

Uses for chain

Uses for chain include:

Decoration
 Belly chain, type of body jewelry worn around the waist
 Jewelry chain, many necklaces and bracelets are made out of small chains of gold and silver
 Chain of office, collar or heavy gold chain worn as insignia of office or a mark of fealty in medieval Europe and the United Kingdom
 Decorating clothing, some people wear wallets with chains connected to their belts, or pants decorated with chains
 Omega chain, a pseudo-chain where the 'links' are mounted on a backing rather than being interlinked
 Tie chain, used to hold in place a tie to the underlying shirt front

Power transfer
 Bicycle chain, transfers power from the pedals to the drive-wheel of a bicycle, thus propelling it. An application of roller chain.
 Chain drive, the main feature that differentiated the safety bicycle
 Chain gun, type of machine gun that is driven by an external power source, sometimes connected by a chain, to actuate the mechanism rather than using recoil
 Chain pumps, type of water pump where a loop of chain inset discs is passed around then through a tube submerged in liquid
 Chainsaw, portable mechanical, motorized saw using a cutting chain to saw wood
 Timing chain, used to transfer rotational position from the crankshaft to the valve and ignition system on an internal combustion engine, typically with a 2:1 speed reduction.

Security and restraint
 Ball and chain, a phrase that can refer to either the actual restraint device that was used to slow down prisoners, or a derogatory description of a person's significant other
 Belly chain (or waist chain), a physical restraint worn by prisoners, consisting of a chain around the prisoner's waist, to which the prisoner's hands are chained or cuffed 
 Bicycle lock (or bicycle chain), lockable chain
 Chain boom, large chains used to exclude warships from harbors and rivers
 Chain link fencing, fencing that utilizes vertical wires that are bent in a zigzag fashion and linked to each other
 Chain mail, a type of armor consisting of small metal rings linked together in a pattern to form a mesh.
 Door chain, a type of security chain on a door that makes it possible to open a door from the inside while still making it difficult for someone outside to force their way inside
 Gang transport chain, a chain used to shackle two or more inmates together for transport or work outside the facility, forming a chain gang
 Leg iron chains (fetters), an alternative to handcuffs
 Prisoner transport restraints, a combination which consists of a pair of handcuffs attached by a longer chain to a pair of leg irons
 On chain-linked handcuffs, the cuffs are held together by a short chain

Traction, pulling and lifting

 Anchor cable, as used by ships and boats; in British nautical usage the component is a cable, the material is chain
 Chain slings
 Chain hoist , device used for lifting or lowering a load
 Chain boat, a type of river craft that used a steel chain laid along the riverbed for its propulsion
 Chain-linked lewis, a self-locking lifting device particularly for stone using a chain link as a pivot
 Curb chain, used on curb bits when riding a horse
 High-tensile chain (or transport chain), chain with a high tensile strength used for towing or securing loads
 Jack chain, a toothed chain used to move logs
 Lead shank (or stud chain), used on horses that are misbehaving
 Pull switch, an electrical switch operated by a ball chain
 Lavatory chain, the chain attached to the cistern of an old-fashioned W.C. in which the flushing power is obtained by a gravity feed from above-head height. Although most cisterns no longer work like that, the phrase "pull the chain" is still encountered to mean "flush the toilet".
 Rigid chain actuator, a type of chain that only bends in one direction, allowing it to operate under compression
 Snow chains, used to improve traction in snow

Weapons
 Chain gun, type of machine gun that is driven by an external power source, sometimes connected by a chain, to actuate the mechanism rather than using recoil
 Chain shot, a type of ammunition for a cannon, used to inflict damage to the rigging of a sail vessel in naval warfare
 Chain weapon, a medieval weapon made of one or more weights attached to a handle with a chain

Other uses

 Chains are a common component of the deflection assembly of disc golf baskets.
 Chains can be used as a percussion instrument for special effects, such as in Arnold Schönberg's Gurre-Lieder and Leoš Janáček's From the House of the Dead.
 Keychain, a small chain that connects a small item to a keyring
 Chain sinnet, a method of shortening a rope or other cable while in use or for storage
 Chain stitch, a sewing and embroidery technique

Types of chain

 Ball chain, type of chain consisting of small sheet metal balls connected via short lengths of wire
 Calibrated chain, a type chain where the link lengths are within a given tolerance, so that it reliably engages with a windlass.
 Flat chain, form of chain used chiefly in agricultural machinery
 Ladder chain, a light wire chain used with sprockets for low torque power transmission
 Long link chain
 O-ring chain, a specialized type of roller chain
 Roller chain, the type of chain most commonly used for transmission of mechanical power on bicycles, motorcycles, and in industrial and agricultural machinery
 Self-lubricating chain, type of chain that uses a bush to continually lubricate the chain
 Silent chain, a type of chain in which the links engage the sprockets similarly to gear teeth
 Stud link chain, a type of chain with metal between the sides of each link, keeping the attached links in place. This helps prevent bunching when the chain is run out from a storage bin, as for use in anchoring ships.
 Short link chain, a chain where the gap between attached links is small relative to thickness.

Connections
Several methods are available to connect chain ends to each other or to other objects, and to apply a load to a chain away from the ends. These methods are usually specific to the type of chain, and must be of the correct size.

Invention
The metal link chain has been in use since at least 225 BC.

Symbolism
The prevalent modern symbolism is oppression, due to the use for a mechanical restriction of the liberty of a human or animal.

Chains can also symbolize interconnectivity or interdependence. It may also denote a hyperlink.

Gallery

See also

References

External links
National Association of Chain Manufacturers, NACM WELDED STEEL CHAIN SPECIFICATIONS
Chain Spec Basics, Grades and Links Explained

 
Mechanical power control
Mechanical power transmission
Jewellery
Nautical terminology